William Downie (4 December 1908 – 11 September 1943) was an Australian rules footballer who played with Footscray and St Kilda in the Victorian Football League (VFL).

Downie played as a ruckman and represented Footscray 54 times before finishing off his VFL career with a year at St Kilda. He was then picked up by Northcote in the Victorian Football Association (VFA) and was a member of their 1937 premiership side.

He served his country in World War II and was killed by a Japanese guard in a Prisoner of War camp.

See also
 List of Victorian Football League players who died in active service

References 
 Main, J. & Allen, D., "Downie, Bill", pp. 236–237 in Main, J. & Allen, D., Fallen — The Ultimate Heroes: Footballers Who Never Returned From War, Crown Content, (Melbourne), 2002.

External links

 Australian War Memorial Roll of Honour: William Downie (VX38839)

1908 births
1943 deaths
Australian rules footballers from Victoria (Australia)
Western Bulldogs players
St Kilda Football Club players
Northcote Football Club players
Eaglehawk Football Club players
Australian Army personnel of World War II
World War II prisoners of war held by Japan
Australian military personnel killed in World War II
Australian prisoners of war
Burma Railway prisoners
Military personnel from Victoria (Australia)